Elmo Shropshire (born October 26, 1936) is an American veterinarian, competitive runner and country music singer. Shropshire, who typically performs under the name "Dr. Elmo", is best known for his Christmas novelty song "Grandma Got Run Over by a Reindeer". He originally recorded the song in 1979 with his then-wife Patsy, then re-recorded it solo for the 1992 album Dr. Elmo's Twisted Christmas and again in 2000 for the album Up Your Chimney. He also recorded two albums of year-round songs: Dr. Elmo's Twisted Tunes (1993) and Love, Death and Taxes (2000).

Personal life
Elmo Shropshire is a native of Lexington, Kentucky and has a Bachelors of Science in Agriculture from the University of Florida and a Doctor of Veterinary Medicine from Auburn University in Alabama. He was racetrack veterinarian at Aqueduct and Belmont Park in New York before moving to San Francisco to open his own hospital, Arguello Pet Hospital. In San Francisco, Shropshire began playing banjo in a bluegrass band, and later became a competitive runner.

Success with "Grandma Got Run Over by a Reindeer"
In 1979, Shropshire recorded "Grandma Got Run Over by a Reindeer" (written by his friend Randy Brooks), and instantly, Elmo & Patsy became regional superstars.  They divorced in 1985.  Since then, Shropshire settled a class action suit against Sony based upon the royalties paid from downloads and ringtone sales.

In 2000, he served as co-writer of an animated Christmas special based on the song. For this television special, he also provided the voices of Grandpa and the narrator.  In 2007, Shropshire was sued by the Fred Rappaport Company, the producer of the show, over the right to use the song in show-related merchandise.

In 2009, Shropshire appeared on Good Morning America,[8] and in 2010, he appeared on Late Night with Jimmy Fallon.[9]

On December 23, 2014, Shropshire performed "Grandma Got Run Over by a Reindeer" on The Meredith Vieira Show as part of a segment called "Real or Fake".

On December 24, 2016, Shropshire performed on Fox News Channel's "FOX and Friends."

On December 26, 2019 Shropshire is featured in the Wall Street Journal article "What's Your Workout" by Jen Murphy.

Later years
Today, Shropshire lives in Novato, California with his wife, Pam Wendell.  Since 1992, he has recorded several solo albums under the name Dr. Elmo. He has been a competitive runner for 25 years.

2022 RACING: Ranked #1 in the World in the Mile & 5K in his age division. Elmo is the USATF National Outdoor Champion (Lexington, KY) in the 400, 800, and 1500M and ranked #1 in the US in those distances. He is the USATF 8K CROSS COUNTRY CHAMPION.(San Diego, Ca) Shropshire is the 2022 National Senior Games Champion in the 800, 1500, and 5K. (Ft. Lauderdale, Fl)  

In October 2019, Shropshire won the US National 5K Cross Country Championship in his age division.
On October 13, 2012, he won his age division in the United States National 5K Cross Country Championship in San Diego, California,  October 27, 2013, he won a gold medal in the World Master's Games as part of the USA 4×400 relay team in Porto Allegre, Brazil.

Discography

Elmo & Patsy

Albums
Playin' Possum (as The Homestead Act) (1974)
Elmo & Patsy (1974)
Will You Be Ready? (1980)
Grandma Got Run Over by a Reindeer (1983)

Singles

Dr. Elmo

Albums
Dr. Elmo's Twisted Christmas (1992)
Dr. Elmo's Twisted Tunes (1993)
Love, Death, and Taxes (2000)
Up Your Chimney (2000)
Dr. Elmo's MisceLOONYous Tunes (2000)
Grandma Got Run Over by a Reindeer (2002)
Christmas in the U.S.A. (2004)
Dr. Elmo Sings the Boos (2005)
Redneck Dracula (2006) (with the Halloween Ghouls)
Redneck Santa (2007)
Dr. Elmo Bluegrass Christmas (2010)
Old Kentucky Home (2013)

Filmography
 2000 - Grandma Got Run Over by a Reindeer — Grandpa Spankenheimer, Adult Jake (Narrator)

Dr. Elmo Music Videos
Grandma Got Run Over by a Reindeer
Grandma Got Run Over by a Reindeer Rap Version
Grandma's Killer Fruitcake
Uncle Johnny's Glass Eye
Christmas All Across the USA
Blame it On El Nino
The Witch and the Toad
Christmas in the USA
Prison Without Martha Stewart
All I Want for Christmas is My Two Front Teeth
Haunted Hoedown
Pointy the Pyramid Pumpkin
Redneck Dracula
Doomsday Waltz
The Fly
The Scariest Thing I'll Ever Do
What Scares You?

References

External links
Official website of Dr. Elmo

Living people
1936 births
Musicians from Lexington, Kentucky
Auburn University alumni
Bluegrass musicians from Kentucky
American bluegrass guitarists
American male guitarists
American comedy musicians
American male singers
American male voice actors
American people of English descent
Singers from Kentucky
People from Novato, California
Comedians from California
Guitarists from Kentucky
20th-century American guitarists
20th-century American comedians
Country musicians from Kentucky
20th-century American male musicians
Masters athletes
American veterinarians
University of Florida alumni